Sarcolaena isaloensis is a species of plant in the Sarcolaenaceae family. It is endemic to Madagascar.  Its natural habitat is subtropical or tropical moist shrubland. It is threatened by habitat loss and is only known from Isalo National Park.

References

Endemic flora of Madagascar
isaloensis
Critically endangered plants
Taxonomy articles created by Polbot